Laurie Scott may refer to:

Laurie Scott (footballer) (1917–1999), English footballer
Laurie Scott (ice hockey) (1900–1977), Canadian ice hockey player
Laurie Scott (politician) (born 1963), Canadian politician

See also
 Lawrence Scott (disambiguation)
Larry Scott (disambiguation)